Ruska may refer to:

Places

Slovak villages
Ruská
Ruská Bystrá
Ruská Kajňa
Ruská Poruba
Ruská Voľa
Ruská Volová
Ruská Nová Ves

Other
Rava-Ruska, a city in Ukraine
Ruska Bela, a city in Bulgaria
Ruska, a village in Seliatyn, Chernivtsi Oblast, Ukraine

Other uses
 Ruska (surname)
 Ruska (grape), another name for the wine grape Gewürztraminer
 Pogoń Ruska coat of arms
 A song by the Finnish band Apocalyptica
 Ruska (car), a Dutch manufacturer of automobile